Badminton has been contested at the Pacific Games since 2003 when it was included as one of ten sports at the Seventh South Pacific Games held in Suva, Fiji. Badminton was added to Pacific Mini Games for the eleventh edition held at Saipan in 2022.

Pacific Games
Flag icons and three letter country code indicate the nationality of the gold medal winner of an event, where this information is known; otherwise an (X) is used. Moving the cursor onto a country code with a dotted underline will reveal the name of the gold medal winner. A dash (–) indicates an event that was not contested.

Pacific Mini Games

See also
Badminton at the Summer Olympics

References
 

 
Pacific Games
Pacific Games